Pavikšrupys (formerly) is a village in Kėdainiai district municipality, in Kaunas County, in central Lithuania. According to the 2011 census, the village was uninhabited. The Pavikšrupys Botanical Zoological Sanctuary is located next to the village.

Demography

References

Villages in Kaunas County
Kėdainiai District Municipality